The following lists events that happened during 1986 in the Union of Soviet Socialist Republics.

Incumbents
General Secretary of the Communist Party of the Soviet Union – Mikhail Gorbachev
Chairman of the Presidium of the Supreme Soviet – Andrei Gromyko
Premier of the Soviet Union – Nikolai Ryzhkov
Chairman of the Supreme Court of the Soviet Union – Vladimir Terebilov

Events

January
25 January – Mikhail Gorbachev proposes a 15-year plan on abolition of nuclear weapons.

February

20 February – The first component of the Mir space station - the core module - is launched.
24 February – VI Winter Spartakiad of the Peoples of the USSR opens in Krasnoyarsk.
25 February – The 27th Congress of the Communist Party of the Soviet Union is opened, where the concept of glasnost emerges.

March
1 March – 1986 Soviet Top League is inaugurated.
13 March
Soyuz T-15 is launched at the Gagarin's Start.
1986 Black Sea incident: American cruiser USS Yorktown and the destroyer USS Caron, claiming the right of innocent passage, enter the Soviet territorial waters near the southern Crimean Peninsula.

April
12 April – 1986 World Ice Hockey Championships are inaugurated in Moscow.
21 April - Mikhail Gorbachev announces that the Soviet Union is ready to dissolve the Warsaw Pact with the simultaneous dissolution of NATO. 
26 April – Chernobyl disaster.

May

4 May – Rock-Panorama-86 festival opens in Moscow.
12 May – The Council of Ministers of the USSR introduces the State Acceptance of Production (gospriyomka).
13 May – The 5th congress of the Union of Cinematographers of the USSR is opened.
20 May – The designing of Chernobyl Nuclear Power Plant sarcophagus starts.

June
3 June – IX Summer Spartakiad of the Peoples of the USSR opens.
28 June – Antonov An-12 of the Soviet Air Forces crashes in Yeysk, killing 10.

July
2 July – Aeroflot Flight 2306 crashes in Komi ASSR, killing 54.
5 July – 1986 Goodwill Games are inaugurated in Moscow.

August
8 August – 1986 FIBA World Championship for Women opens in Minsk, Vilnius and Moscow. 
31 August – Sinking of SS Admiral Nakhimov in the Black Sea, 423 deaths.

September
5 September – The Soviet leg of the World Chess Championship 1986 opens in Leningrad.
20 September – Two Internal Troops servicemen make an unsuccessful attempt to hijack Tu-134A aircraft in Ufa and flee to Pakistan.

October
5 October – Scientist and human rights advocate Yuri Orlov is freed from Siberian exile.
20 October – Aeroflot Flight 6502 crashes in Kuybyshev (now Samara), killing 70.

November
6 November – Koristovka train collision, 44 are dead and about 100 are injured.
14 November – The Molodezhny department store in Moscow is robbed, 3 cash-in-transit workers are killed.
19 November – The law "On Individual Labor Activity" is adopted, approving the use of private enterprises to manufacture some consumer goods.
19 November – The Supreme Soviet of the Soviet Union issues an Appeal to Parliaments and People of the World about global nuclear disarmament.

December
1 December – Popular film Kin-dza-dza! is released.
16 December – Jeltoqsan riots spark in Alma-Ata.
19 December – Soviet authorities announce that Andrei Sakharov and Yelena Bonner now can return to Moscow after a seven-year exile.

Births

January
5 January – Yana Shemyakina, Ukrainian Olympic champion in fencing
6 January – Yuliya Chermoshanskaya, Russian Olympic 4x100 metre relay champion
15 January – Mariya Abakumova, Russian javelin thrower

March
17 March – Olesya Rulin, Russian American actress

April
8 April – Igor Akinfeev, Russian goalkeeper
11 April – Tatiana Kosintseva, Russian chess Grandmaster
27 April – Dinara Safina, Russian tennis player

May
13 May – Alexander Rybak, Norwegian singer

June
12 June – Stanislava Komarova,  Russian swimmer

July
22 July - Olha Bura, Ukrainian activist
31 July – Evgeni Malkin, Russian ice hockey player

September
3 September – Valdas Vasylius, Lithuanian basketball player
9 September – Katy Topuria, Georgian singer

October
16 October – Igor Mangushev, Russian mercenary leader (died 2023)
21 October – Tamerlan Tsarnaev, Chechen terrorist (died 2013)

Deaths

January
11 January – Ilya Averbakh, Soviet film director
30 January – Ivan Papanin, Soviet Polar explorer and twice Hero of the Soviet Union

April
12 April – Valentin Kataev, Soviet writer

May
6 May – Sergei Simonov, Soviet weapons designer
26 May – Vitaly Abalakov, Soviet alpinist

See also
1986 in fine arts of the Soviet Union
List of Soviet films of 1980-91

References